Mapum of Geumgwan Gaya (died 291, r. 259–291) was king of Geumgwan Gaya, a member state of the Gaya confederacy. He was preceded by his father, King Geodeung and succeeded by his son King Geojilmi.

Like the other members of the Geumgwan royal line, his surname was Kim.  Mapum married Queen Hogu, who was the granddaughter of the high official Jo Gwang.

Family
Father: King Geodeung (거등왕, 居登王)
Mother: Lady Mojeong (모정부인, 慕貞夫人)
Wife: Lady Hogu (호구부인, 好仇夫人) – granddaughter of Jo Gwang (조광, 趙匡).
Son: King Geojilmi (거질미왕, 居叱彌王)

Notes

References

See also 
 List of Korean monarchs
 History of Korea
 Three Kingdoms of Korea

291 deaths
Gaya rulers
3rd-century monarchs in Asia
Year of birth unknown